The 2015 Ghana Movie Awards was held at the Accra International Conference Center on 30 December 2015.

Awards 

This is a list of nominations. Winners were announced on 30 December 2015.

References

Ghana Movie Awards
2015 film awards
2015 in Ghana